Various & Gould is a Berlin-based artist duo.

Life 
The artist duo Various & Gould works in collaboration since 2005. After studying at the Berlin-Weissensee School of Art, the artists graduated under the tutelage of Prof Alex Jordan in 2010.

Art 
Various & Gould work in screen-printing and collage, but their art also emerges in public performances or installations.

The artist duo deals with socially prominent themes such as work, migration, (sexual) identity, death, religion or the financial crisis. Various & Gould's work is influenced by (political) poster graphics, Dada and Pop Art. Characteristics are vivid colors combined with typography and encrypted messages
.

Exhibitions (selection) 
 2020: Kollektive Signaturen, Kunstmuseum Dieselkraftwerk Cottbus, Cottbus, Germany
 2019: Keine Ewigkeit für Niemand, Neurotitan, Berlin, Germany
 2018: Imago – a history of portraits, Museum of Urban and Contemporary Art, Munich, Deutschland
 2016: Permanently Improvised, Anno Domini, San Jose, USA
 2016: 2te 11te Interventionale, Showroom IG Metall (+ HaL), Berlin, Deutschland
 2016: Kunst/Plakat/Kunst, Landtag of Brandenburg (+ dkw.), Potsdam, Deutschland
 2015: Made in Berlin, Galerie Mathgoth, Paris, France
 2015: Backjumps 20+1, Kunstraum Kreuzberg/Bethanien, Berlin, Germany
 2013: Wanted Witches - Witches Wanted, Open Walls Gallery, Berlin, Germany
 2013: The Pressure of Printing, Open Walls Galerie, Berlin, Germany
 2013: Kopf an Kopf, Kunstmuseum Dieselkraftwerk Cottbus, Germany
 2012: Backjumps - Junior Issue 2, Kunstraum Kreuzberg/Bethanien, Berlin, Germany
 2012: ReKOLLEKT V, Kunstraum Kreuzberg/Bethanien, Berlin, Germany
 2012: Outside in, ALAN Galerie, Istanbul, Turkey
 2012: Es geht UM die Welt, Kunstmuseum Dieselkraftwerk Cottbus, Germany
 2012: Nostalgia, Rook & Raven Gallery, London, Great Britain
 2011: Street Art Saved My Life, C.A.V.E. Gallery, Los Angeles, US
 2010: Make it fit, Brooklynite Gallery, New York, US
 2010: Wendezeiten, Kunstmuseum Dieselkraftwerk Cottbus, Germany
 2010: Help! - Soziale Appelle im Plakat, Museum of Design, Zürich, Switzerland
 2009: Identity Crisis, Shiv Gallery, London, Great Britain
 2009: À chacun ses étrangers?, Cité nationale de l’histoire de l’immigration, Paris, France
 2008: Time Machine, Brooklynite Gallery, New York, US

Literature 
 PERMANENTLY IMPROVISED – 15 Years of Urban Print Collage, seltmann+söhne, Berlin, 2019, 
 Randgänge des Gesichts: Kritische Perspektiven auf Sichtbarkeit und Entzug, Trajekte, Zentrum für Literatur- und Kulturforschung Berlin, 2016, 
 WILD, Urban Spree Books, Berlin, 2016
 The Art of Rebellion, Publikat Publishing, 2016, 
 Berlin What? – 102 Contemporary Artists, Verlag Ch. Schroer, Berlin, August 2013
 Es geht UM die Welt – Ausstellungskatalog, DKW, Cottbus, 2012
 Trespass 2012, Taschen Press, Cologne, 2011
 Street Art Cookbook, Dokument Verlag, Sweden, 2010
 Urban Interventions, Gestalten Press, Berlin, 2010
 Help! – Ausstellungskatalog, Museum für Gestaltung, Zurich, 2009
 Untitled II, Pro-Actif Communications, Darlington, 2009
 Street Art – Legenden zur Straße, Archiv der Jugendkulturen Verlag, Berlin, 2008/09
 100 Beste Plakate 07 – Ausstellungskatalog, Verlag Hermann Schmidt, Mainz, 2008
 Urban Art Photography, Gestalten Press, Berlin, 2008
 Urban Illustration Berlin, Gingko Press, Hamburg, 2007
 Street Art – Die Stadt als Spielplatz, Archiv der Jugendkulturen Verlag, Berlin, 2006

References

External links 
 Website von Various & Gould
 Artconnect Profil von Various & Gould
 Popkultur kompakt, Flux FM, March 16, 2015
 Madeleine Hoffmann: Die Stadt sieht besser aus mit Various & Gould, bento.de, November 2, 2015
 Sven Schlebes: Himmel hilf - V&G im Interview Theo Magazin, S. 30–33, Heft 4/2015, Autumn 2015
 Just: On the run with Various & Gould Arte Creative, August 6, 2015
 Various & Gould, huffingtonpost.de, 2012–2015
 Marc Schiller, Wooster Collective: New works by V&G, woostercollective.com, February 9, 2011
 Various & Gould: Künstler Duo aus Berlin, artvergnuegen.com
 Street Art mit Various & Gould, Tagesspiegel Kunst, 2015/16, pp. 104–107

Living people
Street artists
Artists from Berlin
German contemporary artists
Year of birth missing (living people)